The Cooper 353 is a Canadian sailboat that was designed by Stan Huntingford as a cruiser and first built in 1979.

The design was later developed into the US Yachts US 35 after Bayliner purchased the moulds for the boat.

Production
The design was built by Cooper Enterprises in Port Coquitlam, British Columbia, Canada, starting in 1979, but it is now out of production.

Design
The Cooper 353 is a recreational keelboat, built predominantly of fibreglass, with wood trim. It has a masthead sloop rig; a raked stem; a raised counter, reverse transom; a skeg-mounted rudder controlled by a wheel and a fixed fin keel. It displaces  and carries  of ballast.

The boat is fitted with an inboard engine with a saildrive for docking and manoeuvring.

The design has sleeping accommodation for five people, with a double "V"-berth in the bow cabin, a "U"-shaped settee around a drop-down dinette table and a straight settee in the main cabin. The galley is located on the port side just forward of the companionway ladder. A navigation station is opposite the galley, on the starboard side. The head is located just aft of the bow cabin on the starboard side.

For sailing downwind the design may be equipped with a symmetrical spinnaker.

See also
List of sailing boat types

Related development
Cooper 416
US Yachts US 35

References

Keelboats
1970s sailboat type designs
Sailing yachts
Sailboat type designs by Stan Huntingford
Sailboat types built by Cooper Enterprises